Denton Vassell (born 13 September 1984) is a British welterweight boxer, based in Ancoats, Manchester, United Kingdom.

Boxing career

Amateur career

The pinnacle of Vassell's amateur career was winning the Amateur Boxing Association championships at welterweight

Professional career

2006

Vassell made his professional debut on 2 September 2006, scoring a TKO victory against Ernie Smith in the 3rd round. In the same year on 9 December Vassell scored a points victory in his second bout against Duncan Cottier.
2007

Vassell returned to the ring in March against Steve Cooper, victory coming when Vassell forced to Cooper retired in the first round. The following August Vassell chalked another points win over Gatis Skuja. The following month Vassell stopped Sherman Alleyne in the first round to record his fifth win. In Vassell's final fight of the year he defeated Yassine El Maachi on points.

2008

On 5 April Vassell managed to stop Manoocha Salari in the 3rd round, score a points win over Jimmy Beech and KO Alex Spitko in the 3rd round improving his professional record to nine wins.

2009

In January, Vassell returned to the ring against Matt Scriven winning via TKO. Two months later Vassell stopped his next opponent Eddie Corcoran. Vassell fought in two more fights in 2009, against Vasile Surcica and Jamal Morrison, beating both by points in six round bouts.

2010

Denton pushed his record to 14 wins in march after Kevin mcCauley retired in the second round, Denton was then offered a shot at the Commonwealth Welterweight title on 16 April against lee Purdy, this would be the first round Denton would go past six rounds with Lee Purdy already doing so, many asked if Denton was fit enough but he proved himself again in a unanimous decision.

Professional boxing record

| style="text-align:center;" colspan="8"|25 Wins (11 knockouts),  4 Losses, 0 Draws
|-  style="text-align:center; background:#e3e3e3;"
|  style="border-style:none none solid solid; "|Res.
|  style="border-style:none none solid solid; "|Record
|  style="border-style:none none solid solid; "|Opponent
|  style="border-style:none none solid solid; "|Type
|  style="border-style:none none solid solid; "|Rd.
|  style="border-style:none none solid solid; "|Date
|  style="border-style:none none solid solid; "|Location
|  style="border-style:none none solid solid; "|Notes
|- align=center
|Loss||25–5||align=left| Evaldas Korsakas
|||||
|align=left|
|align=left|
|- align=center
|Win||25–4||align=left| Jordan Grannum
|||||
|align=left|
|align=left|
|- align=center
|Win||24–4||align=left| Edvinas Puplauskas
|||||
|align=left|
|align=left|
|- align=center
|Loss||23–4||align=left| Kerman Lejarraga
|||||
|align=left|
|align=left|
|- align=center
|Win||23–3||align=left| Chris Jenkinson
|||||
|align=left|
|align=left|
|- align=center
|Win||22–3||align=left| Gary Boulden
|||||
|align=left|
|align=left|
|- align=center
|Loss||21–3||align=left| Viktor Plotnikov
|||||
|align=left|
|align=left|
|- align=center
|Win||21–2||align=left| Craig Kelly
|||||
|align=left|
|align=left|
|- align=center
|Loss||20–2||align=left| Sam Eggington
|||||
|align=left|
|align=left|
|- align=center
|Loss||20–1||align=left| Frankie Gavin
|||||
|align=left|
|align=left|
|- align=center
|Win||20–0||align=left| Ronnie Heffron
|||||
|align=left|
|align=left|
|- align=center
|Win||19–0||align=left| Samuel Colomban
|||||
|align=left|
|align=left|
|- align=center
|Win||18–0||align=left| Ronny McField
|||||
|align=left|
|align=left|
|- align=center
|Win||17–0||align=left| Bethuel Ushona
|||||
|align=left|
|align=left|
|- align=center
|Win||16–0||align=left| Jack Welson
|||||
|align=left|
|align=left|
|- align=center
|Win||15–0||align=left| Lee Purdy
|||||
|align=left|
|align=left|
|- align=center
|Win||14–0||align=left| Kevin McCauley
|||||
|align=left|
|align=left|
|- align=center
|Win||13–0||align=left| Jamal Morrison
|||||
|align=left|
|align=left|
|- align=center
|Win||12–0||align=left| Vasile Surcica
|||||
|align=left|
|align=left|
|- align=center
|Win||11–0||align=left| Eddie Corcoran
|||||
|align=left|
|align=left|
|- align=center
|Win||10–0||align=left| Matt Scriven
|||||
|align=left|
|align=left|
|- align=center
|Win||9–0||align=left| Alex Spitko
|||||
|align=left|
|align=left|
|- align=center
|Win||8–0||align=left| Jimmy Beech
|||||
|align=left|
|align=left|
|- align=center
|Win||7–0||align=left| Manoocha Salari
|||||
|align=left|
|align=left|
|- align=center
|Win||6–0||align=left| Yassine El Maachi
|||||
|align=left|
|align=left|
|- align=center
|Win||5–0||align=left| Sherman Alleyne
|||||
|align=left|
|align=left|
|- align=center
|Win||4–0||align=left| Gatis Skuja
|||||
|align=left|
|align=left|
|- align=center
|Win||3–0||align=left| Steve Cooper
|||||
|align=left|
|align=left|
|- align=center
|Win||2–0||align=left| Duncan Cottier
|||||
|align=left|
|align=left|
|- align=center
|Win||1–0||align=left| Ernie Smith
|||||
|align=left|
|align=left|

References

External links
 

English male boxers
Welterweight boxers
1984 births
Living people
People from Ancoats
Boxers from Manchester